Burdette "Archie" Hess (born 1933) is a former Canadian football player who played for the Calgary Stampeders. He played college football at the University of Idaho. After retirement he embarked on a career as a geologist at Pacific Petroleums. eventually rose to become General Manager of Western Canada Exploration at Petro-Canada in Calgary, Alberta.

References

Living people
1930s births
Players of American football from Idaho
American football guards
Canadian football offensive linemen
American players of Canadian football
Idaho Vandals football players
Calgary Stampeders players
People from Caldwell, Idaho